Duqm Airport  is an airport serving the Arabian Sea port of Duqm in the Al Wusta Region of Oman.

Duqm Airport kicked off its operations, on July 23, 2014, to serve passengers between Duqm and Muscat through a temporary building.  However, on September 17, 2018, the passenger terminal, which can accommodate 500,000 passengers annually, started its operations.. with area size of 8,660 sq. ft. and passenger terminal with two jet bridges .

The airport includes the cargo building with a capacity of 25,000 tonnes annually, with the possibility of expanding it according based on future demand. The airport also has a runway of 4 kilometres long and 75 metres with connecting corridors and aircraft parking slots. 

The runway length does not include  displaced thresholds on each end. There is a VOR on the field.

Statistics

Airlines and destinations

See also
Transport in Oman
List of airports in Oman

References

External links 
OpenStreetMap - Al Duqm International Airport
OurAirports - Duqm International Airport
Oman airports official web site

Airports in Oman
Al Wusta Governorate (Oman)